Steve Pepoon is a television writer who has written for The Simpsons, ALF, and Get a Life. He is also the co-creator of The Wild Thornberrys.

Filmography 
 Writer
 Silver Spoons (1 episode, 1986)
 ALF (14 episodes, 1987–1990)
 It's Garry Shandling's Show (1 episode, 1990)
 Get a Life (1990)
 Ferris Bueller (3 episodes, 1990)
 The Simpsons (1 episode, 1991)
 Homer vs. Lisa and the 8th Commandment (1991)
 The Jackie Thomas Show (1992)
 Roseanne (1 episode, 1994)
 Cleghorne! (1 episode, 1995)
 You Wish (1997)
 The Wild Thornberrys Movie (2002)
 The Wild Thornberrys (2 episodes, 2001–2003)

 Producer
 Roseanne (15 episodes, 1993–1994)
 Cleghorne! (15 episodes, 1995)
 Teen Angel (1 episode, 1998)
 The PJs (3 episodes, 2000)

Awards and nominations 

 1991, won Emmy Award for 'Outstanding Animated Program' for The Simpsons

References

External links 

 

American television writers
American male television writers
Living people
Year of birth missing (living people)